Kanamarua is a genus of sea snails, marine gastropod mollusks in the family Colubrariidae.

Species
Species within the genus Kanamarua include:
 Kanamarua adonis (Dall, 1919)
 Kanamarua aikeni Fraussen & D. Monsecour, 2019
 Kanamarua boswellae (Kilburn, 1975)
 Kanamarua francroberti Fraussen & Lamy, 2008
 Kanamarua hyatinthus Shikama, 1973
 Kanamarua magnifica Fraussen & Chino, 2012
 Kanamarua narcissisma Fraussen & Lamy, 2008
 Kanamarua somalica (Bozzetti, 1993)
 Kanamarua tazimai Kuroda, 1951
 Kanamarua wangae D. Monsecour, Fraussen & Fei, 2017
Species brought into synonymy
 Kanamarua rehderi Kilburn, 1977: synonym of Kanamarua hyatinthus Shikama, 1973

References

 Kuroda T. (1951). Descriptions of a new genus of a marine gastropod, Kanamarua, gen. n., and a new species of a bivalve, Abra kanamarui, sp. n. dedicated to Mr T. Kanamaru on his 60th birthday. Venus. 16(5-8): 68-72
 Bouchet P. & Warén A. (1986 ["1985"]) Mollusca Gastropoda: Taxonomical notes on tropical deep water Buccinidae with descriptions of new taxa. Mémoires du Muséum National d'Histoire Naturelle, A, 133: 457-517.
 Fraussen K. & Lamy D. (2008). Revision of the genus Kanamarua Kuroda, 1951 (Gastropoda: Colubrariidae) with the description of two new species. Novapex 9(4): 129-140

Colubrariidae